The Temptations of Satan is a 1914 American silent film directed by Herbert Blache and starring Joseph Levering, Vinnie Burns and James O'Neill. The film is considered to be lost.

Plot
Satan (James O'Neill) decides to ruin the innocence of ambitious Everygirl (Vinnie Burns), who has a beautiful voice and wishes to pursue a career singing in opera. He thus assumes human form and follows her in order to make sure that she accepts his terms.

Cast
 Joseph Levering as Everyboy
 Vinnie Burns as Everygirl
 James O'Neill as Satan
 Fraunie Fraunholz as Justice
 Morton as Avarice

References

External links
 
 The Temptations of Satan at Lostfilm.com

1914 films
American silent feature films
Films directed by Herbert Blaché
American black-and-white films
American silent short films
Lost American films
The Devil in film
1910s American films
Silent horror films